Feng Jianyu (born August 27, 1992 in Heilongjiang) is a Chinese actor and singer. He portrayed the role of Wu Suowei in the web series Counterattack in May 2015, and entered into the public eye. On September 22, 2015, he collaborated with co-star Wang Qing and released the song This Summer. He portrayed Tu Youyou in the web movie Approaching Journey. In June 2016, he released his first EP Red. In July 2016, he played a lead role in the film Infinite Fight.

Life and career

Life 
Feng Jianyu was born in Heilongjiang. He graduated from Beijing Union University, majoring in acting. In his junior year, he was invited by Wang Qing, who is his lover and classmate of 4 years, to star in a web series.

Career

Film 
Feng Jianyu began his career playing the role of Wu Suowei in the web series Counterattack that was released in August 2015. In September 2015, he participated in the filming of Counterattack's special episode.

In March 2016, he played one of the two leading roles in the web film Approaching Journey. 
In July 2016, he co-starred with Wang Qing in the web movie Infinite Fight.
The movie was nominated for seven awards in the World Chinese Science Fiction Movies Nebula Awards.

Music 
On September 22, 2015, Feng Jianyu collaborated with Wang Qing and released the song This Summer. This Summer ranked No.1 on the Fresh Asia Weekly Charts for four consecutive weeks and also ranked first on the October monthly chart. This Summer also set a record of 460,000 digital copies sold on Sina Weibo. He co-starred with Wang Qing in the music video and short film of This Summer. This Summer music video ranked No.4 in YinYueTai 2015 Mainland TOP 100. Feng Jianyu held three fan meetings for "This Summer" with Wang Qing, in Tianjin, Chengdu and Shenzhen. This Summer won the "Most Popular Collaboration" in the 16th Top Chinese Music Annual Festival.

He also performed the theme song of Approaching Journey which bears the same name. On May 15, 2016, the digital single Approaching Journey was released and sold exclusively on KuGou Music. After just two days, it achieved the title of the platinum record, over 100,000 digital copies sold on KuGou Music. Later in July 2016, he released his first EP Red. The first single in that EP, which is the title track Red , was released on June 16.

Hosting 
In March 2016, Feng Jianyu co-hosted the 2nd KU Music Asian Music Awards red carpet show with Wang Qing. This was the first time he tried hosting.

Discography

EPs

Singles

Filmography

Film

Television series

Host

Awards and nominations 
 Music Awards Ceremony

 Music Program Awards

References

External links 
 

1992 births
Male actors from Heilongjiang
Singers from Heilongjiang
Living people
21st-century Chinese male actors
Chinese male film actors
Chinese male television actors
Chinese Mandopop singers
21st-century Chinese male singers